Kolding is a Danish seaport located at the head of Kolding Fjord in the Region of Southern Denmark. It is the seat of Kolding Municipality. It is a transportation, commercial, and manufacturing centre, and has numerous industrial companies, principally geared towards shipbuilding. The manufacturing of machinery and textiles and livestock export are other economically significant activities.

With a population of 93,544 (1 January 2022), the Kolding municipality is the eleventh most populous in Denmark. The city itself has a population of 61,638 (1 January 2022) and is the seventh largest city in Denmark.

The city is part of the Triangle Region, which includes the neighbouring cities of Fredericia and Vejle.

History

In the Battle of Kolding, fought on 25 December 1658, the allied Polish and Danish forces under hetman Stefan Czarniecki defeated the Swedish forces of Charles X Gustav of Sweden.

A battle between German and Danish forces took place near the town on 23 April 1849 during the First War of Schleswig.

On 9 September, 1955, Kolding was impacted by a high-end F2/T5 Tornado that displaced a car 20 meters into a yard.

On 3 November 2004, the N. P. Johnsen's Fireworks Factory in the suburb of Seest exploded. One firefighter died, 85 people were injured, and around 2000 people were evacuated and some of them lost their homes during this disaster in this suburb of Kolding.

Overview

Located in Kolding is the former royal castle of Koldinghus. This was built in the 13th century by King Eric Klipping and is a museum with certain parts of the castle, including its chapel and hall, being used for governmental ceremonial events. It was the last royal residence in Jutland. Another notable site is the 13th century stone Church of Saint Nicholas, which is one of the oldest in Denmark.

Main sights
The municipal museum, the Museet på Koldinghus, is located in the castle and former royal palace. It has a collection of Danish art from the late Middle Ages to the 1940s, miscellaneous artefacts of local interest, and an extensive collection of items in gold and silver.

The Trapholt art museum features many pieces primarily by Danish artists in its collections of arts from 1900 onwards and a smaller number of non-Danish exhibits. It also features a large collection of chairs.

Botanical garden Geografisk Have is a 14 hectares large park with  more than 2000 different trees, bushes and plants organised in geographical areas,

Also Kolding houses the Danish Museum of Nurses, which is situated in the reception building of the former tuberculosis sanatorium for children. The exhibition also include this past of the buildings. The main part of the sanatorium is now a hotel, situated in a minor forest and overlooking the water. The building itself is very beautiful and built to resemble a palace.

Education 
A branch of University College South can be found in Kolding.

A branch campus of University of Southern Denmark is located in the former hospital which was closed in 1975. The new Campus Kolding opened downtown in 2014. The new building of University of Southern Denmark will be built further to the east at Grønborggrunden in central Kolding.

Kolding is also home to Design School Kolding (Designskolen Kolding), a university design school, which was established in 1967 to provide undergraduate and postgraduate degrees in the areas of fashion, graphic design and textiles.

Sister cities
Kolding is twinned with the following towns.

Transportation

Rail

Kolding is served by Kolding railway station. It is located on the Fredericia-Flensburg railway line and offers direct InterCity services to Copenhagen, Hamburg, Sønderborg, Aarhus and Esbjerg as well as regional train services to Fredericia and Esbjerg.

Notable people

Public Service & Public thinking 

 Princess Dorothea of Denmark (1546 in Kolding –1617) the Duchess of Brunswick-Lüneburg 1561-1592
 Mathias Sommerhielm (1764 in Kolding – 1827) a Norwegian Prime Minister
 Evald Tang Kristensen (1843 in Nørre Bjert near Kolding – 1929) a folklore collector and author
 Christian Peder Kryssing (1891 in Kolding – 1976) a collaborator with Nazi Germany in WWII
 Svend Petersen (1911 in Kolding – 1992)  political researcher in the US, analyst and author
 Bente Hansen (born 1940 in Kolding) a Danish women's rights activist, writer and editor 
 Uffe Haagerup (1949 in Kolding - 2015), mathematician
 Jørn Dohrmann (born 1969 in Kolding) a Danish politician and MEP
 Bjarne Corydon (born 1973 in Kolding), former politician, management consultant and business newspaper editor
 Karina Adsbøl (born 1976 in Kolding), politician, MP since 2011

The Arts 

 Catharine Wernicke (1789 in Kolding – 1862) a Danish pianist, the first Danish woman to perform publicly as a pianist
 Anne Marie Carl-Nielsen (1863 in South Stenderup, near Kolding – 1945) a Danish sculptor
 Thorkild Roose (1874 in Kolding – 1961) a Danish actor and theatre director 
 Christian Daugaard (1901 in Kolding – 1993) was a Danish painter
 Lars Bo (1924 in Kolding - 1999), artist and author
 Erik Paaske (1933 in Kolding - 1992), actor and singer 
 Bent Faurby (born 1937 in Kolding) an author of children's literature and schoolteacher
 Ole Søltoft (1941 in Kolding – 1999) a Danish actor 
 Karl Aage Rasmussen (born 1947 in Kolding) a composer and writer.
 Merete Van Kamp (born 1961 in Kolding) a model turned actress and singer 
 Charlotte Eskildsen (born 1975 in Kolding) a Danish fashion designer.
 Susanne Georgi (born 1976 in Sjølund) a Danish singer, lives and works in Andorra

Sport 

 Søren Petersen (1894 in Kolding - 1945), heavyweight boxer, silver medallist in both the 1920 and 1924 Summer Olympics
 Harald Christensen (1907 in Kolding – 1994) a cyclist, bronze medallist at the 1932 Summer Olympics
 Jan Mølby (born 1963 in Kolding), football player and coach; 364 club caps and 33 for Denmark
 Johnny Mølby (born 1969 in Kolding) a football manager and former player, over 350 club caps
 Tina Bøttzau (born 1971 in Kolding), handball player, twice team gold medallist at 1996 and 2000 Summer Olympics
 Martin Lundgaard Hansen (born 1972 in Kolding) a successful Danish badminton player
 Allan K. Jepsen (born 1977 in Kolding) former professional footballer, over 300 club caps
 Louise Spellerberg (born 1982 in Kolding), handball player
 Jonas Lössl (born 1989 in Kolding), soccer goalkeeper
 Kasper Asgreen (born 1995 in Kolding), professional cyclist

See also
 Kolding Municipality
 Chronicle of the Expulsion of the Grayfriars#Chapter 6 Concerning the Friary in Kolding

References

External links

 
 Official website 

 
Municipal seats of the Region of Southern Denmark
Municipal seats of Denmark
Cities and towns in the Region of Southern Denmark
Kolding Municipality